The 2003–04 season was the 56th season in the existence of FC Steaua București and the club's 56th consecutive season in the top flight of Romanian football. In addition to the domestic league, Steaua București participated in this season's editions of the Cupa României and the UEFA Cup.

First-team squad
Squad at end of season

Competitions

Overall record

Divizia A

League table

Results summary

Results by round

Matches

Cupa României

Results

UEFA Cup

Qualifying round

First round

Second round

References

FC Steaua București seasons
Steaua București